Viktor Semyonovich Abramov, born 18 August 1956 in Min-Kush, Kyrgyzstan, is a Russian politician.

Abramov graduated from the Moscow Aviation Institute with a specialty as an "engineer-economist", and in 2004 was a member of the Federation Council of Russia representing Tver Oblast. In the 2007 elections, Abramov was elected into the State Duma on the list of candidates nominated by United Russia.

Abramov is the Deputy Chairman of the State Duma Committee on Financial Markets.

References

External links
  Viktor Abramov profile at the State Duma website
  Profile at United Russia website

1956 births
Moscow Aviation Institute alumni
Fifth convocation members of the State Duma (Russian Federation)
United Russia politicians
21st-century Russian politicians
Living people
Members of the Federation Council of Russia (after 2000)